Entoloma turci is a species of fungus found in Europe.

See also
List of Entoloma species

References

External links

Entolomataceae
Fungi of Europe
Fungi described in 1881
Taxa named by Giacomo Bresadola